This is a summary of noted incidents that have taken place at Hong Kong Disneyland Resort in Hong Kong. The term incidents refers to major accidents, injuries, deaths, and significant crimes. While these incidents are required to be reported to regulatory authorities for investigation, attraction-related incidents usually fall into one of the following categories:

 Caused by negligence on the guest's part. This can be refusal to follow specific ride safety instructions, or deliberate intent to break park rules.
 The result of a guest's known or unknown health issues.
 Negligence on the park's part, either by the ride operator or maintenance.
 Act of God or a generic accident (e.g. slipping and falling) that is not a direct result of an action on anybody's part.

Hong Kong Disneyland

Main Street, U.S.A.
 On February 13, 2017, a broken Buzz Lightyear toy was mistakenly identified as a bomb, when X-rayed at the entrance of Main Street, U.S.A.

Resort hotels

Disney's Hollywood Hotel
 On August 20, 2018, a cast member was killed in a car crash in the parking lot of Disney's Hollywood Hotel.

Resort-wide incidents

COVID-19 pandemic 

 On January 26, 2020, Hong Kong Disneyland Resort was closed indefinitely due to the COVID-19 pandemic. On June 18, 2020, Hong Kong Disneyland reopened with limited guest attendance, social distancing, temperature checks, and wearing of face masks. However, it was later announced that Hong Kong Disneyland would close again on July 15, 2020 due to a heavy upsurge in domestic cases. It remained closed the following two months, reopening to guests on September 25, 2020. It reopened under strict rules that included, but were not limited to social distancing, reduced capacity, temperature screenings, and mandatory face masks. After reopening for approximately two months, the park closed for a third time on December 2, 2020 due to a rising number of coronavirus cases in the region. The park reopened for a third time on February 19, 2021. The park closed for the fourth time on January 7, 2022 due to the rising number of cases of the Omicron variant, and reopened on April 21, 2022.

See also 
 Amusement park accidents
 List of incidents at Disney parks

References 

Disney-related lists
Incidents
Lists of amusement park incidents